On 17 May 2016, a series of bombings by the terrorist group Islamic State of Iraq and the Levant hit the Iraqi capital city of Baghdad. At least 101 people were killed and 194 injured.

Bombings
A suicide bombing in the all-Shia northern district of Sha'ab killed 41 people and wounded more than 70. A car bomb in the all-Shia neighborhood Sadr City left at least 30 dead and 57 wounded. Another car bomb in the majority-Shia suburb al-Rashid, south of the capital, killed six and wounded 21. A parked car bomb struck a market in the neighborhood of Dora, in southern Baghdad, killing eight people and wounding 22 others. A suicide bomber targeted a restaurant in the Habibiya neighborhood, killing nine and wounding 18. A bomb blast killed one person and wounded another in al-Rashid, south of Baghdad. A bomb exploded near a popular market in the all-Shia neighborhood al-Amin in eastern Baghdad, killing two people and wounding seven others.

The attacks were preceded by a suicide bomb attack in a state-owned cooking gas plant in Taji, north of Baghdad, killing at least 14 people and another wave of attacks, that killed over a hundred people.

The Islamic State of Iraq and the Levant claimed responsibility for the attacks.

References

2016 murders in Iraq
Suicide bombings in 2016
21st-century mass murder in Iraq
2010s in Baghdad
Car and truck bombings in Iraq
ISIL terrorist incidents in Iraq
Mass murder in 2016
May 2016 crimes in Asia
Suicide bombings in Baghdad
2016-05
Terrorist incidents in Iraq in 2016
Islamic terrorist incidents in 2016